Giel Haenen (born 2 June 1934) is a Dutch footballer. He played in one match for the Netherlands national football team in 1964.

References

1934 births
Living people
Dutch footballers
Netherlands international footballers
Place of birth missing (living people)
Association footballers not categorized by position